The 2019 M&M's 200 is a NASCAR Gander Outdoors Truck Series race held on June 16, 2019, at Iowa Speedway in Newton, Iowa. Contested over 200 laps on the  D-shaped oval, it was the 10th race of the 2019 NASCAR Gander Outdoors Truck Series season. The race was postponed from Saturday, June 15 to Sunday, June 16 due to rain.

Background

Track

The track was designed with influence from Rusty Wallace and patterned after Richmond Raceway, a short track where Wallace was very successful. It has over 25,000 permanent seats as well as a unique multi-tiered Recreational Vehicle viewing area along the backstretch.

Entry list

Practice

First practice

Final practice

Qualifying
Qualifying was cancelled due to rain. Chandler Smith won the pole based on owner's points.

Qualifying results

Race

Summary
Chandler Smith started on pole and led the race up until a caution shortly before the end of Stage 1, which was won by Ross Chastain after he got off pit road quickly. Chastain continued his dominating lead, also winning Stage 2.

In the final stage, Austin Hill and Johnny Sauter tangled several times, causing damage to Sauter's truck. Sauter then purposely drove into Hill under caution in retaliation, causing NASCAR to park him for his actions. Sauter would miss the following week's race due to these actions.

Chastain held a comfortable lead over the rest of the field, winning the race with a two-second lead over Brett Moffitt. After the race, NASCAR disqualified Chastain and stripped him of his race win and both stage wins as his truck failed post-race inspection for being too low. This then gave the win to Moffitt, despite him not leading a single lap of the race.

Stage Results

Stage One
Laps: 60

Stage Two
Laps: 60

Final Stage Results

Stage Three
Laps: 80

After the race
Chastain and Niece Motorsports appealed NASCAR's decision to disqualify them, as they stated that the height of Chastain's truck was not an intentional adjustment and it didn't give him an advantage. They also believed the truck's height was the result of minor damage sustained when the race began. The penalty was eventually sustained.

The following week, NASCAR took action against Johnny Sauter for his actions in intentionally wrecking Hill under caution. They issued a 1-race suspension. Under normal circumstances this would mean that Sauter would not compete for the championship that season. However, NASCAR, feeling like stripping playoffs eligibility from Sauter was too harsh, granted Sauter a waiver, allowing him to still make the playoffs if he won a race in the regular season and made the top-30 in driver's points.

References

2019 in sports in Iowa
MandM's 200
NASCAR races at Iowa Speedway